Street Corner Symphony is the second album by Carrie Lucas. Released in 1978 on the SOLAR Records label.

Track listing
"Street Corner Symphony"  6:12
"But My Heart Says No"  4:02
"Tic Toc"  4:17
"The Depths of My Soul"  3:38
"The Edge of Night"  6:13
"Questions"  	5:19
"Simpler Days" 3:42
"Reflections"	1:17
"Street Corner Symphony (12 Version)" 	6:12
"Tic Toc (12 Version)"  5:03

References

1978 albums
SOLAR Records albums
Carrie Lucas albums